William McKay Wright (November 12, 1840 – December 17, 1882) was a lawyer and political figure in Quebec, Canada. He represented Pontiac in the House of Commons of Canada as a Liberal-Conservative member from 1872 to 1878.

He was born in Hull, Lower Canada, the son of Ruggles Wright and grandson of Philemon Wright, and educated at McGill University. He was called to the Lower Canada bar in 1863 and the Ontario bar in 1868. In 1864, he married Mary, the daughter of senator James Skead. He was a lieutenant in the local militia and served during the Fenian raids. He also served as the first mayor of the township of South Hull, later known as Lucerne, from 1879 to 1881. Wright practised law in Aylmer, Hull and Ottawa. He died in New Edinburgh at the age of 42.

Electoral record

References 

1840 births
1882 deaths
Politicians from Gatineau
Anglophone Quebec people
Canadian people of American descent
Conservative Party of Canada (1867–1942) MPs
Members of the House of Commons of Canada from Quebec
Mayors of places in Quebec
McGill University alumni